Jeerawat Thongluae (Thai  จีรวัฒน์ ทองลือ) is a Thai footballer. He plays for Thailand Division 1 League clubside Sisaket.

References

1982 births
Living people
Jeerawat Thongluae
Association football midfielders
Jeerawat Thongluae
Jeerawat Thongluae
Jeerawat Thongluae